WKCY-FM is a country formatted broadcast radio station licensed to Harrisonburg, Virginia, serving the Central Shenandoah Valley. WKCY-FM is owned and operated by iHeartMedia, Inc.

References

External links
 104-3 KCY Country Online
 

1980 establishments in Virginia
KCY-FM
Radio stations established in 1980
IHeartMedia radio stations
Harrisonburg, Virginia